Matterhorn is a 2013 Dutch drama film directed by Diederik Ebbinge. It competed in the main competition section of the 35th Moscow International Film Festival.

Cast
 René van 't Hof as Theo
 Ton Kas as Fred
 Ko Aerts as Autowasser
 Kees Alberts as Johan 8 jaar
 Lucas Dijker as Jongen op voetbalveld
 Porgy Franssen as Kamps
 Alex Klaasen as Zoon Fred
 Elise Schaap as Trudy
 Ariane Schluter as Saskia
 Sieger Sloot as Vader kinderpartijtje
 Michel Sluysmans as Gemeente ambtenaar
 Helmert Woudenberg as Predikant

References

External links
 

2013 films
2013 comedy films
Dutch comedy films
2010s Dutch-language films